The Puppet Master: Hunting the Ultimate Conman is a 2022 British Netflix docuseries directed by Sam Benstead and Gareth Johnson. The three-part series follows the search for British conman Robert Hendy-Freegard, and details how he masked his true identity in order to steal money from a multitude of different people for more than two decades. The series was released on 18 January 2022.

Reception 

The series gained generally positive reviews. The Guardian praised the series as "unbelievable and unforgettable" and gave it four stars. The Independent gave the series three stars and opined that the show is "a deft but incomplete story of unbelievable deception".

References

External links 

2022 British television series debuts
2020s British documentary television series
English-language Netflix original programming
Netflix original documentary television series
Television series based on actual events
Documentary television series about crime